Pratt-Read is an American manufacturing company based in Sycamore, Illinois, that produces screwdrivers. It is a subsidiary of Ideal Industries. Founded in 1798, it is one of the oldest companies in the United States.

History 

Pratt-Read was founded in Ivoryton, Connecticut, in 1798 as Pratt, Read & Company, originally producing beads, buttons, and billiard balls from elephant tusks imported from Africa. The company began to specialize in manufacturing ivory piano keys in 1839 and eventually piano action mechanisms.

The company made its first screwdrivers in 1834 but stopped in 1840, instead selling the handles and blades to smaller companies made at the Pratt, Read and Company Factory Complex.  During World War II, the company continued producing screwdriver blades and suspended production of piano parts to manufacture Waco CG-4 gliders for the military. The company built 956 of the fabric-covered wood and steel airframes.

Piano part production continued after the war, but the company gradually shifted its focus to manufacturing screwdrivers, and in the late 1980s, ended its piano parts business, closing a facility in Central, South Carolina, and began to focus on screwdrivers exclusively. Pratt-Read manufactures its own handles, blades, and—after a 2005 acquisition of Wisconsin-based American Industrial Manufacturers—bits, all in the U.S., which it sells directly to users under its own name, as well as to manufacturers such as Stanley, Snap-on, Danaher, and Klein.

In 2009, Pratt-Read filed for Chapter 11 bankruptcy protection.

On March 22, 2010, Ideal Industries announced the acquisition of Pratt-Read from bankruptcy. Ideal acquired the Pratt-Read name and equipment and continued production out of existing Ideal facilities, as the Pratt-Read facility in Shelton, Connecticut had already ended operations.

Gallery

See also 

 Pratt, Read and Company Factory Complex
 Pratt-Read LBE
 Pratt-Read TG-32
 Sohmer & Co.

References

External links 
 Pratt-Read web site
 Pratt-Reed archives at National Museum of American History Archives Center

Tool manufacturing companies of the United States
American companies established in 1798
Privately held companies based in Illinois
Companies based in Middlesex County, Connecticut
Aircraft manufacturers of the United States
Ideal Industries
Ivory trade
Manufacturing companies established in 1798